A whitlow is an infection of the tip of the finger.

Whitlow may also refer to:

 Whitlow, California, US
 Whitlow (name), a surname and given name